Newtown is a small village in Essington parish, South Staffordshire, England.

Newtown lies between the Landywood area of Great Wyrley (to the north) and Bloxwich (to the south). The village lies on Walsall Road, the main route between Walsall and Cannock, which forms part of the A34.

Villages in Staffordshire
South Staffordshire District